This is a list of the European Hot 100 Singles and European Top 100 Albums number ones of 1999, as published by Music & Media magazine.

Chart history

Notes

References

See also
 1999 in music
 List of number-one hits in Europe

Europe
1999
1999